Cambridge, Corpus Christi College, MS 139 is a northern English manuscript compiled in c. 1170. Apart from preliminary additions (i + ii), it contains two separate volumes, comprising 180 folios in total. The original first volume has 165 folios in twenty gatherings, about half of which are occupied by the historical compilation Historia regum, which runs from f. 51v to 129v. In the sixteenth century, the codex was bequeathed by Matthew Parker to the Parker Library of Corpus Christi College, Cambridge, where it is held to this day.

Contents

See also
 Cambridge University Library, Ff. i.27

Further reading

Peter Hunter Blair. “Some Observations on the Historia Regum attributed to Symeon of Durham.” Celt and Saxon. Studies in the Early British Border, ed. Nora K. Chadwick, Cambridge: Cambridge University Press, 1963. 63–118.
J. Hodgson Hinde. Symeonis Dunelmensis Opera et Collectanea. Publications of the Surtees Society 51. 1868. lxvii–lxxiii.
M.R. James. A Descriptive Catalogue of the Manuscripts of Corpus Christi College, Cambridge. Vol 1. 1912. 317–23.

12th-century manuscripts
English chronicles
Manuscripts of Corpus Christi College, Cambridge